Nifelheim is the self-titled debut album by Swedish black metal band Nifelheim.

Track listing
"The Devastation" - 3:00
"Black Curse" - 4:56
"Unholy Death" - 2:02
"Possessed by Evil" - 3:53
"Sodomizer" - 5:07
"Satanic Sacrifice" - 3:14
"Storm of Satan's Fire" - 4:33
"Witchfuck" - 3:03

References

1995 debut albums
Nifelheim albums
Albums produced by Fredrik Nordström